The 2017 Bangkok Challenger II was a professional tennis tournament played on hard courts. It was second edition of the tournament and part of the 2017 ATP Challenger Tour. It took  place in Bangkok, Thailand between 9 and 14 January 2017.

Singles main-draw entrants

Seeds

 1 Rankings are as of January 2, 2017.

Other entrants
The following players received wildcards into the singles main draw:
  Phassawit Burapharitta
  Patcharapol Kawin
  Werapath Sirijatiyaporn
  Chaleechan Tanasugarn
 
The following players received entry from the qualifying draw:
  Daniel Altmaier
  Sriram Balaji
  Lee Kuan-yi
  Jimmy Wang

Champions

Singles

  Janko Tipsarević def.  Li Zhe, 6–2, 6–3.

Doubles

  Sanchai Ratiwatana /  Sonchat Ratiwatana def.  Sadio Doumbia /  Fabien Reboul, 7–6(7–4), 7–5.

References

 
 ATP Challenger Tour
Tennis, ATP Challenger Tour, Bangkok Challenger II
Tennis, ATP Challenger Tour, Bangkok Challenger II

Tennis, ATP Challenger Tour, Bangkok Challenger II